The Chicago Throwbacks were a team of the Premier Basketball League that begin play in fall 2007. Their home arena was Attack Athletics on Chicago's West Side.

They were originally part of the American Basketball Association for the first part of the 2007–08 season, playing alongside their intra-city rivals the Cicero Cometas USA and the South Chi-Land Infernos.  When the Infernos never began play and the Cometas folded, the Throwbacks were left to play several games against exhibition teams that happened to count in the standings.

A second chance at stability came when the Chicago Aztecas of the PBL shut down and the PBL needed a replacement team.  The Throwbacks took that opportunity and played in the PBL's inaugural season in its Central Division.

Roster
Head Coach: Joe Boylan

2009 Season Schedule

*  Replacement game for a game at Mid-Michigan

External links
Official website

2007 establishments in Illinois
Basketball teams established in 2007
Throwbacks
Former Premier Basketball League teams
Defunct American Basketball Association (2000–present) teams